The Pont du Diable or Pont Vieux is a medieval stone arch bridge at Céret, France, built between 1321 and 1341.

History 
At the time of its construction it became the world's largest bridge arch, being bigger than the Ponte della Maddalena in Italy which held the world record until then. It remained so until 1356, when the Castelvecchio Bridge in Verona (Italy) became the new largest bridge. Damaged during the war of the First Coalition (1792-1797), French general Luc Siméon Auguste Dagobert wanted to blow it up to keep the Spanish army from going back to Catalonia. The bridge was saved just before being destroyed thanks to the action of Representative Joseph Cassanyes and restored later.

Legend
The locals wanted a bridge to be built across the river and called upon the devil to build it for them. The devil agreed on the condition that he would claim the first soul to cross the bridge. Once the bridge was built the locals sent a cat across for the devil to claim its soul. Then for many years afterwards no person would cross, just in case – a legend common to many devil's bridges in France.

In arts
 The bridge was painted by Paul Cézanne and Auguste Herbin.
 It features in a scene from the film The Hunchback by André Hunebelle, in which three swordsmen are sent to Spain to kill Lagardère and the daughter of the Duke of Nevers.

Gallery

See also
 List of bridges in France
 List of medieval bridges in France
Other very large medieval bridges
 Puente del Diablo (Martorell) (37.3 m span)
 Ponte della Maddalena (37.8 m span)
 Puente de San Martín (Toledo) (40 m span)
 Nyons Bridge (40.53 m span)
 Castelvecchio Bridge (48.7 m span)
 Pont Grand (Tournon-sur-Rhône) (49.2 m span)
 Pont de Vieille-Brioude (54.2 m span)
 Trezzo sull'Adda Bridge (72 m span)

References

External links

 
 
 Ceret virtual Tours

Bridges in France
Céret
Buildings and structures in Pyrénées-Orientales
Stone bridges in France
Transport in Occitania (administrative region)
Bridges completed in the 14th century
Buildings and structures completed in 1341
Monuments historiques of Pyrénées-Orientales
Stone arch bridges